Pahtodawgyi is a Buddhist pagoda located in Amarapura, Burma, north of the Taungthaman Lake. It was built in 1819 by King Bagyidaw.

Notes

References

Pagodas in Myanmar
Buildings and structures in Mandalay Region
Religious buildings and structures completed in 1819
19th-century Buddhist temples